Cyclic GMP-AMP synthase (cGAS, cGAMP synthase), belonging to the nucleotidyltransferase family, is a cytosolic DNA sensor that activates a type-I interferon response. It is part of the cGAS-STING DNA sensing pathway. It binds to microbial DNA as well as self DNA that invades the cytoplasm, and catalyzes cGAMP synthesis. cGAMP then functions as a second messenger that binds to and activates the endoplasmic reticulum protein STING to trigger type-I IFNs production. Mice lacking cGAS are more vulnerable to lethal infection by DNA viruses and RNA viruses. In addition, cGAS has been shown to be an innate immune sensor of retroviruses including HIV. The human gene encoding cGAS is MB21D1 on chromosome 6.

References 

Transferases